In Norse mythology, Slagfiðr (Old Norse "beating-Finn") is one of a trio of brothers along with Völundr and Egil. In the Poetic Edda poem Völundarkviða, Slagfiðr is attested as the seven-year husband of the valkyrie Hlaðguðr svanhvít.

Notes

References

 Orchard, Andy (1997). Dictionary of Norse Myth and Legend. Cassell. 

Characters in Norse mythology